Chechiș may refer to several places in Romania:

 Chechiș, a village in Dumbrăvița Commune, Maramureș County
 Chechiș, a village in Bălan Commune, Sălaj County
 Chechiș (river), a river in Maramureș County

and to:
 the Chechis, a Gurjar clan